Kanaipur Sriguru High School is a school located at Hooghly district, India. It is a Bengali Medium boys' school and is affiliated to the West Bengal Board of Secondary Education for Madhyamik Pariksha (10th Board exams), and to the West Bengal Council of Higher Secondary Education for Higher Secondary Examination (12th Board exams). The school was founded in 1970.

See also
Education in India
List of schools in India
Education in West Bengal

References

External links

High schools and secondary schools in West Bengal
Schools in Howrah district
Educational institutions established in 1970
1970 establishments in West Bengal